Colleen of the Pines is a 1922 American silent Western film directed by Chester Bennett and starring Jane Novak, Edward Hearn and Alfred Allen.

Cast
 Jane Novak as Joan Cameron
 Edward Hearn as Barry O'Neil
 Alfred Allen as Duncan Cameron
 J. Gordon Russell as Paul Bisson
 Charlotte Pierce as Esther Cameron
 Ernest Shields as Jules Perrault
 Bowditch M. Turner as Jerry-Jo

References

External links

 

1922 films
1922 Western (genre) films
American black-and-white films
Films directed by Chester Bennett
Film Booking Offices of America films
Silent American Western (genre) films
1920s English-language films
1920s American films